XDA may refer to:

O2 Xda, a brand of smartphone and pocket PC phone
XDA Flame, pocket PC device of the O2 Xda device family
XDA Developers, technology website whose name references the above phone model
The IATA Code for Seyresse Airport, France
The ICAO Code for Bureau Veritas, France